Shalimar Paints  is an Indian paints manufacturing company. The company is engaged in manufacturing and marketing of decorative paints and industrial coatings. Some of India’s buildings and structures such as the Howrah Bridge, Rashtrapati Bhawan, Salt Lake Stadium, All India Institute of Medical Sciences, and many others, continue to be painted with Shalimar Paints.

History 

Shalimar Paints was founded in 1902 by two British entrepreneurs AN Turner and AC Wright as Shalimar Paints Colour & Varnish Ltd. In the same year, the company set up a large scale manufacturing plant in Howrah, West Bengal, the first such plant in entire South East Asia. In 1928, Pinchin Johnson & Associates of UK bought control from the British entrepreneurs AN Turner and AC Wright. In 1963, the company's name was changed to Shalimar Paints Ltd. after Turner Morisson & Co stepped in as new management.

With access to high-end technology, the company introduced many firsts in the industrial coatings segment such as high build zinc coatings, radiation resistant coatings for nuclear power plants, polyurethane paint for fighter aircraft and railway coaches, among others. Shalimar was the first company to paint a fighter aircraft for the Indian Army.

In 1972 Shalimar went public and in 1989, the company was acquired by the O.P. Jindal Group and the Hong-Kong based S.S. Jhunjhnuwala Group

External links

 Official website

References

Chemical companies of India
Paint companies of India
Manufacturing companies based in Gurgaon
Chemical companies established in 1902
Companies listed on the National Stock Exchange of India
Indian brands
Indian companies established in 1902
Companies listed on the Bombay Stock Exchange